Officially spelled Arni, and sometimes Arani, also known as Periya arani is a major commercial, industrial and cultural hub and also a divisional headquarter in Tiruvanamalai district of Tamil Nadu, India. The town is the second largest urban center next to the district headquarters, Tiruvannamalai, and is administered by a selection grade municipality. Arni is home to silk weaving, spinning mills and agricultural industries. Famous Arni silk and a paddy variety named Arni Ponni, known for its rich aroma originates at Arni. The town is often nicknamed as The Silk City. Arni also has a rich cultural heritage - a major center of Tamil Jainism.

History 

Pallavas were the first to rule Arni and were followed by Rashtrakutas in 968. The Chola period, including the reigns of Kulothunga Chola II (1070–1122) and Rajadhiraja Chola II (1166–1178), witnessed more developments in administration including formation of feudatories. Inscriptions also reveal several grants and donations made by Cholas to temples in the form of villages.

In 1640 Jagir of Arani was granted to Vedaji Bhaskar Pant, a Marathi Brahmin. The Jagir was continuously headed by the descendants of Bhaskar Pant till the Zamindari Abolition Bill was passed in 1948.

Raja Thirumala IV Rao Sahib built a sophisticated bungalow for his lover, an Anglo-Indian lady, there. During the Nawab period, there was a struggle between the British, French and Nawab Hyder Ali. The British captured Arani. There is also a palace near the town, now used by the agriculture department.

Freedom Movement 

Mahatma Gandhi visited Arni twice, once in 1932 and the second time in 1934. During his second visit he was accompanied by Dr Rajendra Prasad. Gandhiji's visits aimed at boosting Harijan upliftment and the movement for the boycott of Simon Commission, Gandhiji visited Dr V Hariharan, an eminent physician and freedom fighter of Arni at his residence and held extensive consultations with him, as the latter was already actively involved in the upliftment of the impoverished weaver community of Arni.

Fort 

There is a fort area in the heart of the town. It houses the forest department, sub jail, registration office, police station, women police station, and agricultural office.

A monument situated in the parade ground of the fort commemorates Col. Robert Kelly, who was surveying the Arani area. Kelly was killed in a duel on 29 September 1790 by his junior officer Capt. Urban Vigors, who in his chagrin erected the monument.

A temple built by the Emperor Dasarathar the father of Sri Rama, Lakshmana, Bharatha and Sathrungna, still exits on the banks of Kamandalam the river of Arni named Puthira (meaning:son or child) kamaeshwarar temple after the worship by Dasarathar at this temple Ramar was born to him. This happened in the Times of Ramayanam. Of the 11 yagas Dasaratha had to perform for getting male progeny, the first one was performed here. Rishi Rushyashringar performed the yagna.

Battle of Arani 

The Battle of Arnee (or Battle of Arani) took place at Arani, India on 3 December 1751 during the Second Carnatic War. A British-led force under the command of Robert Clive defeated and routed a much larger Franco-Indian force under the command of Raza Sahib. The French troops were guarding a convoy of treasure. Clive took up a position in swampy ground, crossed by a causeway in which the convoy was forced to pass. The French were thrown into disorder and forced to retreat, but night saved them from total destruction. The treasure, however, was captured.

Post independence

Arani was constituted as a third-grade municipality in the year 1951. As per G.O. No. 564, date: 02.04.1951, classified as Second Grade Municipality. The population of the town was then 24567. The entire area of Arani Revenue village was included within the jurisdiction of the municipality. At 2007 from 9.5.1983 onwards as per G.O. No. 851, classified as first grade municipality. The Population of the town was then 63741. At present From 2008 on words as per G.O No- 1067, Classified as Selection Grade Municipality. The Population of the town was then 92375

Geography 

Demographics 

According to 2011 census, Arni town with 33 wards had a population of 63,671 with a sex-ratio of 1,036 females for every 1,000 males, much above the national average of 929, but extended town including all the sub urban area had a population of 92,375. A total of 6,346 were under the age of six, constituting 3,200 males and 3,146 females. The average literacy of the town was 76.9%, compared to the national average of 72.99%. The town had a total of 14889 households. There were a total of 23,298 workers, comprising 153 cultivators, 343 main agricultural labourers, 2,185 in house hold industries, 17,919 other workers, 2,698 marginal workers, 33 marginal cultivators, 100 marginal agricultural labourers, 224 marginal workers in household industries and 2,341 other marginal workers. As per the religious census of 2011, Arani (M) had 89.16% Hindus, 7.39% Muslims, 1.8% Christians, 0.01% Sikhs, 0.01% Buddhists, 1.43% Jains, 0.19% following other religions and 0.0% following no religion or did not indicate any religious preference.

Administration & politics

Municipality

The Arani municipality was established in 1931 during British times. It was promoted to a second-grade municipal municipality in 1954, first grade in 1989, selection grade in 2008. The municipality has 33 wards and there is an elected councillor for each of those wards. The functions of the municipality are devolved into six departments: general administration/personnel, Engineering, Revenue, Public Health, city planning and Information Technology (IT). All these departments are under the control of a Municipal Commissioner who is the executive head. The legislative powers are vested in a body of 33 members, one each from the 33 wards. The legislative body is headed by an elected Chairperson assisted by a Deputy Chairperson.

Regional Transport Office

Arani is the newly created regional transport office in Thiruvannamalai district. Until 2018, the Thiruvannamalai code was operated by TN 25 as the Sub Transport Office. Subsequently, with the efforts of the Minister of Hindu Religious Affairs, Mr Sevoor Ramachandran, a Created new Regional Transport Office code, TN 97, was created.. The headquarters of the Regional Transport Office is Arani. It consists of the taluks of Polur, Arani, Chetpet, Jamunamarattur, Cheyyar, Vembakkam, Vandavasi and Kalasapakkam.

Revenue Division
Arani revenue code is a newly developed district in Thiruvannamalai district. The revenue Division was funded by the efforts of the Hindu Religious Affairs Minister, Mr. Sevur Ramachandran. Opened in April 2016 by Palanisamy. The Arani Revenue Division consists of the taluks of Arani, Polur, Chettupattu, Kalasapakkam and Jamunamathur. In addition to this, the Arani Revenue Division is one of the highest earners in the Thiruvannamalai district.

State Assembly constituency
Arani block is one of the 234 assembly seats in Tamilnadu. Arani municipality is subject to the Arni (state assembly constituency) and Arni (Lok Sabha constituency).
In the legislative elections held in 2016, he belongs to the Anna dravida munnetra kazagam (AIDMK). Arani was the winner of Mr.sevoor.Ramachandran.

Lok Shaba constituency 

 In 2008, according to the composition of the constituency, the vandavasi lok sabha was constituted into the Arani (Lok Sabha constituency). Previously. Arani (state assembly constituency), vellore was a part of the lok sabha.
 It is the 12th lok sabha constituency in the 39 lok sabha constituencies in the state of Tamil nadu. These lok sabha constituencies include the following assembly constituencies. Arani, Polur, vandavasi, cheyyar, Gingee and mailam are the assembly constituencies.
 In the 2019 lok sabha election, the Mr.MK.Vishnuprasad, belonging to the Indian national congress league (congress), won the seat. Arani is a (lok sabha constituency) and, covering a wider area, since 2007, a constituency of the Parliament of India.

Economy 

Major revenue generated from couple of business Rice production and Silk saree weaving, more than 300 rice mills to produce best quality rice called "Arni Ponni" from paddy, the town also has a large communities of silk weavers who specialize in making silk sarees. Hand looms are most frequently used for the weaving, although recently some have turned to mechanized methods such as Power looms. Arani is the number one in revenue earning in Tiruvannamalai District, Tamil Nadu. Though the town is not well known outside Tamil Nadu, a bulk of India's silk apparels is produced by the people of Arani.

Transport

By Road
Arani is well connected to major cities by road and road. The city of Arni is connected by various well-paved roads, In 2018 NHAI and Ministry of Road Transport and Highways minister Nitin Gadkari proposed Rs.10,000 crore Chennai to Salem Eight Lane Green Corridor Express Highway which connects through Arani and distance is just 277.3 km from Chennai to Salem but this project has been facing opposition from a section of locals including farmers, over fears of losing their farm lands and many environmentalists were against this project because the project has been proposed through the reserve forest and water bodies, so this project has kept in pending.  

 State Highways 4 - Arcot - Arani - Villupuram Road
 State Highway 132 - Bangalore - Vellore - Arani Road
 State Highway 116 - Kanchipuram -Cheyyar - Arani Road
 District Road 40- Arani - Devikapuram - Avalurpet Road
 District Road 751- Arani - Sandavasal - Padavedu Road
 District Road - Arani - ValaipandalRoad
 State Highway 43 - Arani - Vandavasi - Tindivanam - Puducherry Road
 State Highway - 38 - Arani - Thiruvannamalai - Salem and Trichy Road
 State Highway - SH133 Arani - Etiwadi - Polur - Chengam Road

A bypass of Chennai (Arcot) Road, Chennai Road and Cuddalore Road is being completed.

By Bus 

There are two bus stands in the town and a TNSTC operates a daily service to major south Tamil Nadu cities. Arani to Chennai has an every 10 minutes once a bus at 02:15 am to 10:45 pm. The major inter-city bus routes to towns has predominant bus services to Vellore, Tiruvannamalai, Kanchipuram and Villupuram, Bangalore, Salem, Coimbatore, Tirupur, Erode, Trichy, Thanjavur, Tiruvallur, Tirutani, Tirupathi, Puduchery, Thoothukudi, Chidambaram, Tindivanam, Nagapattinam, Madurai, Cuddalore and other cities. The SETC and TNSTC operates long-distance buses routes to the important cities.

By Train 

The Tindivanam–Nagari route from the city is planned by the central government to connect trains via Arani. Also Katpadi–Villupuram as Planned by Central Government to connect trains via Arani in 1886. But this railway station has been shifted to Kalambur on the Arani–Thiruvannamalai road. The railway station is the Arani railway station. The station is the third largest railway station in the district, apart from the Thiruvannamalai town and the Arani Railway Junction station. It opened in 1889 for public use. The railway station is well connected to cities like Bangalore, Svandpur, Vellore, Katpadi, Kolkata Howrah, Tirupati, Cuddalore, Pondicherry, Mannargudi, Mayavaram, Kumbakonam, Trichy, Dindigul, Madurai, Chennai Central, Arakkonam and Tiruvallur.

Education 

Arani is separate Education District in Tiruvannamalai District. There are two Engineering colleges were presented in Arani they are University College of Engineering, Anna University. and A.C.S Engineering College. Polytechnic Colleges and ITI Colleges also located in Arani.

The Govt. Boys High School, Govt. Girls High School, Subramaniya Sastri High School and more Private higher secondary schools were located in Arani. The affiliated body of AISECT under MCIT GoI: M/S MTECH Business Solutions (IT Training Division), is present in Arani.

References

External links 
 Tamilnad Government site

Cities and towns in Tiruvannamalai district